The 2021 Rugby League World Cup squads may refer to:
 2021 Men's Rugby League World Cup squads, sixteen international twenty-four-man squads competing in the men's competition
 2021 Women's Rugby League World Cup squads, eight international twenty-four-woman squads competing in the women's competition
 2021 Wheelchair Rugby League World Cup squads, eight international twelve-man squads competing in the wheelchair competition
 2021 Physical Disability Rugby League World Cup squads, four international squads competing in the physical disability competition

See also 
 2021 Rugby League World Cup (disambiguation)
 2021 Rugby League World Cup qualifying (disambiguation)